A solar tower, in the context of astronomy, is a structure used to support equipment for studying the Sun, and is typically part of solar telescope designs. Generically, the term solar tower has many more uses especially for a type of power production using Earth's Sun. Solar tower observatories are also called vacuum tower telescopes.

Solar towers are used to raise the observation equipment above atmospheric turbulence caused by solar heating of the ground and the radiation of the heat into the atmosphere.  Traditional observatories do not have to be placed high above ground level, as they do most of their observation at night, when ground radiation is at a minimum.

The horizontal Snow solar observatory was built on Mount Wilson in 1904.  It was soon found that heat radiation was disrupting observations.  Almost as soon as the Snow Observatory opened, plans were started for a  tower that opened in 1908 followed by a  tower in 1912.  The  tower is currently used to study helioseismology, while the  tower is active in UCLA's Solar Cycle Program.

The term has also been used to refer to other structures used for experimental purposes, such as the Solar Tower Atmospheric Cherenkov Effect Experiment (STACEE), which is being used to study Cherenkov radiation, and the Weizmann Institute solar power tower.

Examples
List of solar telescopes
Solar Observatory Tower Meudon in France

External links
Mount Wilson
150 ft Solar Tower
60 ft Solar Tower
STACEE home page

Astronomical observatories
Telescope types